Franck Laloë (born May 28, 1940) is a French quantum physicist, author, and open archive initiator. He is emeritus research director at the French National Centre for Scientific Research (CNRS).

Education and career 

Laloë was born in Rabat, Morocco and studied physics at the École Polytechnique in Paris from 1960 to 1962. His studied at University of Paris VI (later Pierre and Marie Curie University) for a two-part doctorate. His PhD from 1963 to 1968 (Doctorat de troisième cycle) involved research on spin-polarized helium-3 systems. He obtained Doctorat d'État in 1970. He worked for the CNRS and became director from 1978. Later Laloë worked at the Kastler–Brossel Laboratory in Paris, where he was the director from 2004 to 2014.

Laloë is the initiator of the open archive for scientific works, HAL, created in 2001 at the Centre pour la communication scientifique directe (CCSD) of the CNRS. He deals with digital archiving on optical media (CD and DVD) and is president of a corresponding research group (GIS-DON).

Laloë's research deals with optical pumping, acoustics (including chaos), superfluid helium-3, foundations of quantum mechanics and ultracold quantum gases (Bose-Einstein condensates), as well as optical information storage technology. Laloë is co-author of a popular series of quantum mechanics textbook with Bernard Diu and Claude Cohen-Tannoudji first published in French by Éditions Hermann in 1973. Its first English translation was published by Wiley in 1977. The book series is now in its second edition in 2020.

Honors and awards 

Laloë received the Prix de l'État from the French Academy of Sciences in 1988, the Prix Aimé Cotton in 1970 from the Société Française de Physique, and in 2000 the Prix des trois physiciens from the École Normale Supérieure in Paris and the Eugène Bloch Foundation.

Bibliography

Books

Chapters

Articles

References 

Living people
1940 births
21st-century physicists
20th-century physicists
École Polytechnique alumni
Research directors of the French National Centre for Scientific Research
People from Rabat
Quantum physicists
French physicists
Theoretical physicists
Academic staff of the École Normale Supérieure
Pierre and Marie Curie University alumni